Tamar Beruchashvili (born April 9, 1961) is a Georgian diplomat and politician who has been the Georgian Ambassador to the United Kingdom since March 2016, and previously was the Minister of Foreign Affairs, a position she held from November 11, 2014 until September 1, 2015. She had previously served as Minister of Trade and Foreign Economic Relations from 1998 until 2000 and Minister of Euro-Atlantic Integration in 2004. She also worked as Deputy Minister of Foreign Affairs from 2000 to 2003 and again from 2013 until her appointment as minister in 2014. Beruchashvili also worked as a professor at Tbilisi State University from 2000 until 2010. She was appointed Minister of Foreign Affairs on November 11, 2014, and held that post until September 1, 2015 when she was replaced by Giorgi Kvirikashvili. Beruchashvili was later appointed the new Georgian Ambassador to the United Kingdom from 2016 to 2020.

References

Women government ministers of Georgia (country)
1961 births
Living people
21st-century politicians from Georgia (country)
21st-century women politicians from Georgia (country)
Alumni of the University of Limerick
Ambassadors of Georgia (country) to the United Kingdom
Carleton University alumni
Diplomats from Tbilisi
Female foreign ministers
Foreign Ministers of Georgia
Indiana University Bloomington alumni
Peoples' Friendship University of Russia alumni
Politicians from Tbilisi
Tbilisi State University alumni
Academic staff of Tbilisi State University
Women ambassadors from Georgia (country)
Women diplomats from Georgia (country)